Patrick Brown may refer to:

 Patrick Brown (cricketer) (born 1998), English cricketer
 Patrick Brown (ice hockey) (born 1992), American ice hockey player
 Patrick Brown (journalist), British-Canadian journalist with the Canadian Broadcasting Corporation
 Patrick Brown (Canadian politician) (born 1978), Canadian politician and mayor of Brampton, Ontario, Canada
 Patrick Brown (Northern Irish politician), Northern Irish politician
 Patrick Brown (photographer) (born 1969), Australian photojournalist, recipient of World Press Award 2018
 Sleepy Brown (Patrick Brown, born 1970), American R&B singer, songwriter, and record producer
 Patrick O. Brown (born 1954), American professor of biochemistry at Stanford University
 Patrick (Bischoff) Brown (born 1978), American engineer, producer and studio owner
 Patrick Brown (American football) (born 1986), American football offensive tackle
 Patsy Brown (Patrick A. Brown, 1872–1958), Irish-American maker of the uilleann pipes

See also 
 Pat Brown (disambiguation)
 Patrick Browne (disambiguation)
 Sir Patrick Broun, 1st Baronet (–1688), of the Broun baronets
 Brown (surname), a surname of English and Scottish origin